Eduards Dašķevičs (born 12 July 2002) is a Latvian footballer who plays as a midfielder or wing back for Hamarkameratene.

He hails from Daugavpils. On 1 July 2018 he joined the youth system of Anderlecht. He also made his first-team debut in the summer of 2019, first in a friendly match against RWDM and then another friendly against Benfica. Internationally, he played 3 matches each for Latvia U17 and Latvia U19 before joining Latvia U21 in 2020, at the age of 18.

In 2021 he was signed by his first senior team, Norwegian club Hamarkameratene. He made his debut in the 2021 1. divisjon against Åsane, and made his Eliteserien debut in 2022 against Viking.

References

2002 births
Living people
People from Daugavpils
Latvian footballers
Latvia youth international footballers
Latvia under-21 international footballers
Hamarkameratene players
Norwegian First Division players
Latvian expatriate footballers
Expatriate footballers in Belgium
Latvian expatriate sportspeople in Belgium
Expatriate footballers in Norway
Latvian expatriate sportspeople in Norway
Association football midfielders